Crystal Lake is a village census-designated place and part of the town of Ellington, in Tolland County, Connecticut, United States. The population was 1,945 at the 2010 census. The CDP includes an eponymous lake.

Geography
The CDP is home to Crystal Lake, a  lake that straddles the border between Ellington and Stafford. Most of the lake shore is occupied by private residences, but there is a small public beach called Sandy Beach on the south side of the lake.

According to the United States Census Bureau, the CDP has a total area of 20.9 km (8.1 mi2).  20.2 km (7.8 mi2) of it is land and 0.7 km (0.3 mi2) of it (3.35%) is water.

Demographics
As of the census of 2000, there were 1,459 people, 552 households, and 421 families residing in the CDP.  The population density was 72.2/km (187.1/mi2).  There were 634 housing units at an average density of 31.4/km (81.3/mi2).  The racial makeup of the CDP was 97.67% White, 0.41% African American, 0.07% Native American, 0.82% Asian, 0.21% from other races, and 0.82% from two or more races. Hispanic or Latino of any race were 1.03% of the population.

There were 552 households, out of which 36.1% had children under the age of 18 living with them, 64.3% were married couples living together, 7.6% had a female householder with no husband present, and 23.7% were non-families. 17.2% of all households were made up of individuals, and 5.3% had someone living alone who was 65 years of age or older.  The average household size was 2.64 and the average family size was 3.00.

In the CDP, the population was spread out, with 26.3% under the age of 18, 4.0% from 18 to 24, 34.3% from 25 to 44, 25.7% from 45 to 64, and 9.7% who were 65 years of age or older.  The median age was 38 years. For every 100 females, there were 100.4 males.  For every 100 females age 18 and over, there were 100.6 males.

The median income for a household in the CDP was $61,897, and the median income for a family was $69,375. Males had a median income of $46,393 versus $36,944 for females. The per capita income for the CDP was $24,645.  About 5.6% of families and 7.9% of the population were below the poverty line, including 13.2% of those under age 18 and 2.8% of those age 65 or over.

References

CAES: Crystal Lake, Ellington - Invasive Aquatic Plant Program

Census-designated places in Tolland County, Connecticut
Ellington, Connecticut
Census-designated places in Connecticut
Villages in Connecticut